
Year 375 (CCCLXXV) was a common year starting on Thursday (link will display the full calendar) of the Julian calendar. At the time, it was known as the Year after the Consulship of Augustus and Equitius (or, less frequently, year 1128 Ab urbe condita). The denomination 375 for this year has been used since the early medieval period, when the Anno Domini calendar era became the prevalent method in Europe for naming years.

Events 
 By place 

 Roman Empire 
 November 17 – Emperor Valentinian I concludes an enduring peace with the Alamanni in Germany, then marches into Illyricum to repel an invasion of the Quadi and the Sarmatians on the  Danube frontier. While negotiating with the Quadi, Valentinian, age 54, becomes so enraged that he dies in a fit of apoplexy at Brigetio (Hungary). Extreme cruelty has marked his 11-year reign, but he has also founded schools and provided physicians to serve the poor of Constantinople. 
 The Quadi accept an uneasy peace from Merobaudes (Magister militum), which gives them land to settle on the Danube.
 Gratian, age 16, takes over the government at Augusta Treverorum (modern Trier), but ministers wishing to retain the loyalty of the Illyrian army fear a usurper. They proclaim Valentinian's 4-year-old son Valentinian II co-emperor with his mother, Justina, as regent. Gratian reserves for himself the administration of the Gallic provinces, and hands over Italy, Illyrium, Hispania and Africa to his stepmother, who makes Mediolanum (Milan) her residence.
 Gratian, advised by his chief advisor Ambrosius, begins a systematic persecution of the pagans. He confiscates the fortunes of the temples and adds the money to the Imperial Treasury. He proscribes Arianism and Donatism.
 In Africa, the dissident Berber prince Firmus is delivered to the Romans by his brother Gildon.

 India 
 Emperor Chandragupta II becomes ruler of the Gupta Empire (India). He is the son of Samudragupta the Great and retains his reign by an aggressive expansionist policy.

 Asia 
 Geungusu becomes king of the Korean kingdom of Baekje.

 By topic 

 Education 
 The earliest extant books – a school textbook and an account book – with bound wooden leaves, are lost at the Dakhla Oasis in western Egypt. The desert sands preserve them for modern archaeologists.

 Religion 
 The first two Korean Buddhist temples are built.
 Saint Jerome retires to the desert of Chalcis (Syria).
 The Maronite Church is founded by Saint Maron in Lebanon.
 The Talmud of Babylon is written by Rav Ashi. This commentary on the Mishnah contains approximately 2.5 million words on 5.894 pages.

Births 
 Orosius, Christian historian and theologian (approximate date)
 Zong Bing (or Shaowen), Chinese artist and musician (d. 443)

Deaths 

 February 23 – Saint Gorgonia, daughter of Gregory the Elder
 May 30 – Emmelia of Caesarea, Byzantine Eastern Orthodox priest
 September 3 – Mansuetus, Christian bishop and saint
 November 17 – Valentinian I, Roman emperor (b. 321)
 Geunchogo (or Chogo II), Korean ruler of Baekje
 Kipunada, Indian ruler of the Kushan Empire
 Pambo (or Pemwah), Coptic Desert Father (b. 305)
 Rav Papa, Babylonian Jewish amora and talmudist
 Samudragupta, Indian emperor of the Gupta Empire
 Wang Meng (or Jinglüe), Chinese politician (b. 325)

References